Fugu chiri is a pufferfish soup. It is also known as tetchiri.

See also
Fugu
 List of Japanese soups and stews

References

Japanese soups and stews
Fish dishes